The 1986 Florida Attorney General election was held on November 4, 1986. Bob Butterworth would be elected defeating Jim Watt with 58.63% of the vote. Incumbent James C. Smith would not run in this election.

Primary election 
Primary elections were held on September 2, 1986.

Democratic primary 
The positions for Walt Dartland are known. Dartland would say while running for Attorney General that he was opposed to the death penalty, giving the juries the option of recommending life sentences without parole instead of the death penalty. He would also uniquely offer a money-back guarantee for anyone who made a donation under $100 and was unsatisfied with his performance when he became attorney general would give a refund.

Candidates 

 Ed M. Dunn, Jr., State Senator 
 Bob Butterworth, former Sheriff of Broward County
 Joe Gersten, State Senator
 Walt Dartland, deputy Attorney General and consumer rights advocate.

Results

Republican primary 
Watt would be in favor of: giving tougher penalties to those who were crack cocaine dealers, give more power to the attorney general for fighting consumer fraud especially for the elderly, limiting the amount of appeals death row inmates can make, increase the federal government's commitments to intersect drug smugglers, giving state cabinet members two terms while he would be against gambling in casinos.

Candidates 

 C. Lavon Ward, former Broward County public defender, state representative and Broward County state circuit court judge. Attorney for the Broward County Republican Party.
 Jim Watt, State Representative, Florida House of Representatives minority leader and attorney.

Results

General election

Candidates 
Bob Butterworth, Democratic

Jim Watt, Republican

Results

References 

Florida Attorney General elections
Florida
1986 Florida elections